Toshakhana is a government owned department under the control of Cabinet Division of Pakistan formed in 1974. Its main purpose is to keep gifts which are received by members of parliament, ministers, foreign secretaries, the President, and the Prime Minister.

Rules and Regulations 
The rules and regulations are defined in the “Tosha Khana (Management  Regulation) Act 2022”.

Etymology 

Toshakhana literally translates into "treasure-house". It is a word of Persian 

origin.

Toshakhana lends its legacy to the Mughal Emperor.

References

Government of Pakistan
Pakistan federal departments and agencies